Patrick Sweeney may refer to:

 Patrick Sweeney (gunsmith), American, gunsmith and author
 Patrick Sweeney (rowing) (born 1952), British Olympic Games rowing coxswain
 Patrick Sweeney (politician) (1939–2020), American, member of the Ohio Senate and member of the Ohio House of Representatives
 Patrick Sweeney (entrepreneur) (born 1970), American entrepreneur
 Pat Sweeney (born 1954), American, member of the Wyoming House of Representatives